Olancha  (Timbisha: Pakwa' si) is a census designated place in Inyo County of the U.S. state of California. As of the 2010 census, the population was 192, up from 134 at the 2000 census.

Located in the Owens Valley next to the now mostly dry Owens Lake, the arid settlement is home to a major bottled water plant for Crystal Geyser Natural Alpine Spring Water.

Geography

It is on US Highway 395 near the junction of State Route 190, approximately  due north of Los Angeles. Owens Lake - a dry saline lakebed - lies to the northeast of Olancha. Olancha Creek flows from the slopes of nearby Olancha Peak (12,123 ft), passing near the town of Olancha, and finally towards Owens Lake. To the east of town lie some sand dunes, as well as a hot spring known as "Dirty Socks".

Climate
According to the Köppen Climate Classification system, Olancha has a cold semi-arid climate, abbreviated "BSk" on climate maps due to it being in the rainshadow of the Sierra Nevada.

History
Olancha was established by Minnard Farley, who came to the area in 1860 and discovered silver ore in the nearby Coso Range.  The name "Olancha" is believed to be derived from the nearby Yaudanche tribe. For processing the ore, he built a stamp mill just south of Olancha Creek.  The remains of a stone wall from this mill still exists and has been designated as a California Historical Site (marker #796).

The first post office at Olancha opened in 1870.

On August 11, 1969 Manson Family members Charles “Tex” Watson and Dianne “Snake” Lake settled down in Olancha two days after Watson had stabbed Sharon Tate to death. Here, Watson bought a newspaper revealing that it still was a mystery who committed the Manson murders and confessed to Lake: “I killed her, Charlie (Manson) ordered me to do so, it was fun”. This fact was witnessed by Lake during the Watson trial in 1971. Lake was shortly put into custody in Independence after complaints from Olancha inhabitants for swimming nude. After a few weeks the two of them left Olancha for the final Manson hideout in Death Valley.

California Historical Landmark
Farley's Olancha Mill Site is a California Historical Landmark number 796, assigned on September 16, 1964 on U.S. Route 395 in California in Olancha, California.

The California Historical Landmark reads:
NO. 796 FARLEY'S OLANCHA MILL SITE - In 1860, while working for the Silver Mountain Mining Company in the Coso Mountains, M. H. Farley conceived the idea of building a processing mill on a creek that flowed into Owens Lake. He explored and named Olancha Pass that year, and by December of 1862 had completed the first mill and furnace in the Owens River Valley, on Olancha Creek about one mile west of this marker.

Demographics

2010
The 2010 United States Census reported that Olancha had a population of 192. The population density was 24.4 people per square mile (9.4/km). The racial makeup of Olancha was 133 (69.3%) White, 0 (0.0%) African American, 4 (2.1%) Native American, 8 (4.2%) Asian, 0 (0.0%) Pacific Islander, 38 (19.8%) from other races, and 9 (4.7%) from two or more races. Hispanic or Latino of any race were 47 persons (24.5%).

The Census reported that 192 people (100% of the population) lived in households, 0 (0%) lived in non-institutionalized group quarters, and 0 (0%) were institutionalized.

There were 78 households, out of which 23 (29.5%) had children under the age of 18 living in them, 44 (56.4%) were opposite-sex married couples living together, 1 (1.3%) had a female householder with no husband present, 5 (6.4%) had a male householder with no wife present.  There were 7 (9.0%) unmarried opposite-sex partnerships, and 0 (0%) same-sex married couples or partnerships. 22 households (28.2%) were made up of individuals, and 6 (7.7%) had someone living alone who was 65 years of age or older. The average household size was 2.46.  There were 50 families (64.1% of all households); the average family size was 3.10.

The population was spread out, with 44 people (22.9%) under the age of 18, 9 people (4.7%) aged 18 to 24, 37 people (19.3%) aged 25 to 44, 69 people (35.9%) aged 45 to 64, and 33 people (17.2%) who were 65 years of age or older.  The median age was 47.2 years. For every 100 females, there were 115.7 males.  For every 100 females age 18 and over, there were 120.9 males.

There were 97 housing units at an average density of 12.3 per square mile (4.8/km), of which 78 were occupied, of which 44 (56.4%) were owner-occupied, and 34 (43.6%) were occupied by renters. The homeowner vacancy rate was 2.2%; the rental vacancy rate was 2.9%.  108 people (56.3% of the population) lived in owner-occupied housing units and 84 people (43.8%) lived in rental housing units.

2000
As of the census of 2000, there were 134 people, 50 households, and 38 families residing in the CDP. The population density was 18.4 people per square mile (7.1/km). There were 62 housing units at an average density of 8.5 per square mile (3.3/km). The racial makeup of the CDP was 53.73% White, 0.75% Native American, 5.97% from other races, and 9.70% from two or more races. 37.31% of the population were Hispanic or Latino of any race.

There were 50 households, out of which 40.0% had children under the age of 18 living with them, 60.0% were married couples living together, 14.0% had a female householder with no husband present, and 24.0% were non-families. 20.0% of all households were made up of individuals, and 4.0% had someone living alone who was 65 years of age or older. The average household size was 2.68 and the average family size was 3.13.

In the CDP, the population was spread out, with 32.1% under the age of 18, 3.7% from 18 to 24, 26.9% from 25 to 44, 26.9% from 45 to 64, and 10.4% who were 65 years of age or older. The median age was 37 years. For every 100 females, there were 86.1 males. For every 100 females age 18 and over, there were 89.6 males.

The median income for a household in the CDP was $30,000, and the median income for a family was $46,250. Males had a median income of $31,250 versus $26,250 for females. The per capita income for the CDP was $18,124. There were 4.5% of families and 9.4% of the population living below the poverty line, including 17.2% of under eighteens and none of those over 64.

Politics

In popular culture
 Author Kliph Nesteroff lived in Olancha and ran the Ranch Motel while chronicling its film history.
 The Twilight Zone episode 100 Yards Over the Rim was filmed in Olancha.
 Part of the film Bug (2007) directed by William Friedkin, starring Ashley Judd, Michael Shannon and Harry Connick, Jr., was filmed in Olancha.
 Other films filmed in or near Olancha include Iron Man (2008), Panic in Motion (2005), Taxidermist (2008) and Tremors (1990).
 Ambient composer Harold Budd (raised in the desert town of Victorville, California) recites his poem "Distant Lights of Olancha Recede" on the album By the Dawn's Early Light. "Olancha Farewell" is a short synthesizer piece on Budd's album Lovely Thunder.
 The 1941 film, "High Sierra", featuring Ida Lupino and Humphrey Bogart, was filmed in Olancha.
 Two episodes of The Twilight Zone, "Third from the Sun" (1960) and "A Hundred Yards Over the Rim" (1961) were filmed here.
 The town is featured in the video game American Truck Simulator.

See also
California Historical Landmarks in Inyo County

References

External links
Olancha in Popular Culture

Census-designated places in California
Census-designated places in Inyo County, California
Populated places in the Mojave Desert